Maria Kannon Zen Center (MKZC) is a non-profit practice center in the Sanbo Kyodan tradition of Zen Buddhism, located in Dallas, Texas and founded in 1991 by the guiding teacher Ruben Habito (a Dharma heir of Yamada Koun). MKZC derives its name by combining the names of the Virgin Mary of Christianity and Kannon bodhisattva of Buddhism. It is actually the name of a figurine revered in Japan during Christian persecution there. Many of the MKZC members are individuals who consider themselves Christian, with Habito himself being a practicing Catholic and former Jesuit priest. MKZC is listed with the American Zen Teachers Association.

See also
Buddhism in the United States
Timeline of Zen Buddhism in the United States

Notes

References

External links
Maria Kannon Zen Center
Fort Worth Zendo

Buddhist temples in Texas
Religious buildings and structures in Dallas
Buddhism in Texas
Zen centers in the United States